Montaña Clara (Spanish meaning "light-colored mountain") is a small uninhabited islet belonging to the Chinijo Archipelago, in the northeastern part of the Canary Islands, only a short distance (about ) northwest of La Graciosa. The islet area is only 1.33 km2.

Being a refuge for marine birds, the island is part of the integral nature reserve Los Islotes, which is part of the natural park Chinijo Archipelago. In August 2007 the island was offered for sale by the heirs to the last owner, Mariano López Socas, who was mayor of a small Lanzarote town for 9 million euros.

References

External links 

Parque Natural del Archipiélago Chinijo (in Spanish);
Reserva Natural de los Islotes (in Spanish).

Islands of the Canary Islands
Uninhabited islands of Spain